Casa del Quart d’Anyós  is a house located at Avinguda Sant Cristòfol, Anyós, La Massana Parish, Andorra. It is a heritage property registered in the Cultural Heritage of Andorra. It was built in 1950–1.

References

External links

La Massana
Houses in Andorra
Houses completed in 1951
Cultural Heritage of Andorra